Bergeret is a French surname. Notable people with the surname include:
 Claude Bergeret
 Jacques Bergeret (1771–1857), French naval officer and admiral
 Jean Bergeret
 Jean-Louis Bergeret (1641–1694), member of the Académie française
 Jean-Pierre Bergeret (1752–1813), French botanist
 Louis François Étienne Bergeret (1814–1893), French physician
 Pierre-Nolasque Bergeret (1782–1863), French painter and lithographer

See also 
 Claude Njiké-Bergeret

French-language surnames